Alioth is a star in the Ursa Major constellation.

Alioth may also refer to:

 Alioth (Debian), a free software service
 Alioth (Marvel Cinematic Universe), a fictional entity created by Marvel Comics

See also
 Gabrielle Alioth
 Alioth Epsilon Fenrir